Michael Dyer (born October 13, 1990) is an American football running back. He played college football at Auburn and Louisville.

College career

Auburn
As a true freshman in 2010, Dyer rushed for 1,093 yards on 182 carries and five touchdowns, breaking the Auburn record for most rushing yards by a freshman, previously held by Bo Jackson. During the 2011 BCS National Championship Game against the Oregon Ducks he rushed for 143 yards on 22 carries and was named the Offensive Player of the Game.

Dyer finished the 2011 regular season, his sophomore year, with 1,242 yards rushing on 242 attempts, an average of 5.1 yards-per-carry. He rushed for 10 touchdowns and averaged 103.5 yards-per-game. He was named to the Associated Press' All-SEC first-team and the Coaches' All-SEC first-team.

Prior to Auburn's appearance in the 2011 Chick-fil-A Bowl, Dyer was suspended indefinitely for testing positive for synthetic marijuana and possession of a weapon, which was later used in an armed robbery allegedly committed by four members of the Auburn team. Dyer requested to transfer from Auburn and was granted a conditional release. On January 6, 2012, Auburn released Dyer from his football scholarship to transfer.

Arkansas State
After his release from Auburn, Dyer followed his previous offensive coordinator, Gus Malzahn, to Arkansas State University. According to NCAA rules Dyer would have to sit out a year to play for the Red Wolves.

On March 10, 2012, Dyer and teammate Ronnie Wright were pulled over in separate cars for speeding by the Arkansas State Police. The police officer, Cpl. Royce Denney, discovered a gun and possibly marijuana in Dyer's car. Denney scolded Dyer about the gun during the 58 minute stop and confiscated it without any justification. Denney also dumped the bag of suspected marijuana onto the ground. He also turned off the cruiser camera during the stop, though some audio was recorded (mostly of Denny lecturing Dyer). Dyer and White were each cited with going 96 m.p.h. in a 70 m.p.h zone and fined $175, but no other charges were filed. The news of this event was not immediately made public.

Rumors began in July 2012 that Dyer was transferring to Pittsburg State University in Kansas. Dyer denied these rumors in a July 20, 2012 public press conference by stating that "I never considered transferring."

However, on July 27, 2012, the Arkansas State Police contacted ASU to reveal that they would be releasing a video of the March 10 traffic stop as a result of a Freedom of Information Act request from the press. Malzahn subsequently reviewed the complete video for the first time. Malzahn, who was informed about the incident in March but was led to believe (by Dyer) it involved a gun but no drugs, claimed to have heard "incriminating remarks" on the video and dismissed Dyer from the team on July 28, 2012.

Coincidentally with the release of the video, the state police fired Cpl. Denney, citing the unconventional stop and that it was Denney's second time in the last three months to not conform to the law.

Arkansas Baptist College
Dyer attended Arkansas Baptist College. He did not play football and instead worked toward an associate degree. He was able to complete 46 hours in 3 semesters and earned an associate degree. He considered the NFL Supplemental Draft but wanted to get rid of his bad name and prove he is of good character.

Louisville
On August 2, 2013, it was announced that Dyer would enroll at the University of Louisville. He was eligible to play immediately and had two years of eligibility remaining.

On December 23, 2014, it was announced that Dyer was academically ineligible to play in Louisville's final game of the 2014 season, which was the Belk Bowl against Georgia. This effectively ended his college football career.

Professional career

Oakland Raiders
After going undrafted and not being offered a free-agent deal Dyer was signed on May 11, 2015 by the Oakland Raiders after attending a tryout at the team's rookie minicamp.

Saskatchewan Roughriders
Dyer signed with the Saskatchewan Roughriders on June 16, 2016. He was later released on August 3, 2016.

Texas Revolution
In 2017, Dyer signed with the Texas Revolution of the Champions Indoor Football league. He was named Rookie of the Year and led the Revolution to a CIF championship.

Cedar Rapids River Kings
On October 6, 2019, Dyer signed with the Cedar Rapids River Kings of the Indoor Football League for the 2020 season. The 2020 season was cancelled after one game due to the onset of the COVID-19 pandemic and the River Kings subsequently folded.

References

External links
Auburn Tigers bio
Louisville Cardinals bio

1990 births
Living people
Sportspeople from Little Rock, Arkansas
Players of American football from Arkansas
Under Armour All-American football players
American football running backs
Canadian football running backs
African-American players of American football
African-American players of Canadian football
Auburn Tigers football players
Louisville Cardinals football players
Oakland Raiders players
Toronto Argonauts players
Saskatchewan Roughriders players
Arkansas Baptist College alumni
21st-century African-American sportspeople